When the Waves Are Gone is a 2022 Philippine drama film written and directed by Lav Diaz. It stars John Lloyd Cruz, Ronnie Lazaro, Shamaine Buencamino, and Don Melvin Boongaling. The film was selected to be screened in the out of competition category at the 79th Venice International Film Festival where it premiered in September 5, 2022.

Premise 
One of the top investigators in the Philippines, Lieutenant Hermes Papauran (John Lloyd Cruz), is at a moral crossroads. He witnesses first-hand the brutal anti-drug campaign that the police forces he is part of are implementing with dedication. Hermes is being physically and spiritually corroded by the crimes, leading to him catching a severe skin condition brought on by anxiety and guilt. As he tries to heal, a troubled history that haunts him eventually comes back for a reckoning.

Cast 

 John Lloyd Cruz
 Ronnie Lazaro
 Shamaine Buencamino
 Don Melvin Boongaling
 Anna Vilela de Costa
 Monica Calle
 Lucinda Loureiro
 Ronaliza Jintalan
 Aryanne Gollena
 Roel Laguerta
 Neil Alvin
 Danila Ledesma

References

External links 

 

2022 films
2022 drama films
Philippine drama films
Philippine black-and-white films
Films directed by Lav Diaz